"The Secretary" is the 95th episode of NBC sitcom Seinfeld. This was the ninth episode for the sixth season, and was the first to use Castle Rock Entertainment's new logo after its acquisition from Turner. It aired on December 8, 1994.

Plot
Jerry takes his mother's fur coat and his jacket to be dry cleaned. Jerry, Elaine and Kramer go to the movies. Kramer meets Uma Thurman and writes her phone number on Jerry's dry cleaning ticket. Jerry spots Willie, the dry cleaner, wearing his jacket. He confronts Willie and demands his clothes back. Because Willie's wife Donna is out wearing the fur coat, he demands Jerry show him the ticket, which Kramer still has.

George is authorized to hire a secretary. He passes over attractive women so he can concentrate on his work, and hires Ada, who is very efficient and plain-looking. However, he becomes smitten with her efficiency and has sex with her at work. During sex, George screams, "I'm giving you a raise!" George talks George Steinbrenner into giving Ada the raise he promised. He is upset when he learns the raise was so much that her salary is greater than his. He tries to talk Steinbrenner into giving him a raise as well, but walks out when Steinbrenner goes off on a tangent and starts talking about lack of money when he himself was a young man.

Elaine buys a dress at Barneys because it looked great in there, but later it looks awful. She realizes they are using mirrors which make people look thinner. Kramer needs moisturizer, so she brings him along when she goes to return the dress. Kramer buys the moisturizer. Elaine tries on another dress, then goes outside the store looking for an "unbiased" mirror. At Barneys, Kenny Bania is looking for a new suit; instead, he purchases Kramer's vintage suit for $300. Kramer is left in his underwear in the women's dressing room. Jerry arrives and asks Kramer for the ticket, but it was in Kramer's trousers, which are now in Bania's possession. Bania wants his money back because the suit was stained by the moisturizer. Kramer refuses to trade back, so Jerry agrees to buy Bania two meals in exchange for the ticket, but both the dry cleaning number and Uma Thurman's phone number have been erased by the moisturizer. Jerry spots Donna wearing his mother's fur coat, and wrestles it away from her. He lets Kramer wear the coat over his underwear so he can leave the store. Elaine is forced to buy the dress because the clerk notices road salt on it and realizes she wore it outside the store.

Jerry and Bania have a meal at Mendy's restaurant again. Bania tells Jerry that he wrote down the telephone number from the ticket before it was washed out and got a date with a woman named Uma.

References

External links 
 

Seinfeld (season 6) episodes
1994 American television episodes